Harris A. Lamb (1904 – March 7, 1999) was an American football, basketball, and track coach. He served as the head football coach (1931–1941) and head basketball coach (1929–1937, 1939–1942) at Ohio Northern University in Ada, Ohio.  He also coached track at Ohio Northern. Lamb to his alma mater, Coe College in Cedar Rapids, Iowa, to serve as the head football coach (1945–1947) and head basketball coach (1942–1952).

A native of Boone, Iowa, Lamb was captain of both the football and basketball teams at Coe.  As coach at Coe, he was a mentor to Marv Levy,  future Pro Football Hall of Fame coach. He was the brother of college football coach Clyde A. Lamb.

Head coaching record

Football

References

External links
 

1904 births
1999 deaths
American football fullbacks
Basketball coaches from Iowa
Coe Kohawks football coaches
Coe Kohawks football players
Coe Kohawks men's basketball coaches
Coe Kohawks men's basketball players
Ohio Northern Polar Bears football coaches
Ohio Northern Polar Bears men's basketball coaches
College track and field coaches in the United States
People from Boone, Iowa
Players of American football from Iowa
Basketball players from Iowa